María Antonia Blasco Marhuenda (born 1965), known as María Blasco, is a Spanish molecular biologist. She is the current director of the Spanish National Cancer Research Centre (Centro Nacional de Investigaciones Oncológicas, CNIO).

Life
Blasco was born in 1965. She obtained her PhD in 1993 for her research at the Centro de Biología Molecular Severo Ochoa (UAM-CSIC), under the supervision of Margarita Salas. That same year, Blasco joined the Cold Spring Harbor Laboratory in New York (USA) as a Postdoctoral Fellow under the leadership of Carol W. Greider (who was to win a Nobel Prize in 2009).
In 1997 she returned to Spain to start her own research at the Centro Nacional de Biotecnología in Madrid. She joined the Centro Nacional de Investigaciones Oncológicas (CNIO) in 2003 as Director of the Molecular Oncology Programme and Leader of the Telomeres and Telomerase Group. In 2005 she was also assigned as Vice-Director of Basic Research and in 2011 she was appointed as CNIO Director.

Research 

 Isolation of the core components of mouse telomerase and generation of the first knockout mouse for telomerase; 
 Generation of the first mouse with increased telomerase expression in adult tissues; 
 The finding that mammalian telomeres and subtelomeres have epigenetic marks characteristic of constitutive heterochromatin; 
 Discovery of telomeric RNAs, which are potent telomerase-inhibitors whose expression is altered in cancer;
 Demonstration that telomerase activity and telomere length determine the regenerative capacity of adult stem cells;
 Identification of the longest telomeres as a universal feature of adult stem cell niches;
 The finding that telomerase overexpression in the context of cancer resistant-mice improves organismal fitness, produces a systemic delay in ageing and an extension in median life-span;
 Discovery that telomeres rejuvenate after nuclear reprogramming;
 Identification of the molecular mechanisms by which short telomeres/DNA damage limit nuclear reprogramming of defective cells;
 Discovery that telomeric protein TRF1 can act as both a tumour suppressor and as a factor in ageing prevention.

Professional experience 

 2011-	Director Spanish National Cancer Research Centre (Centro Nacional de Investigaciones Oncológicas, CNIO)
 2005-2011	Vice-Director of Basic Research (CNIO)
 2003-2011	Director, Molecular Oncology Program (CNIO)
 2003–present	Head, Telomeres and Telomerase Group (CNIO)
 1997-2003	Staff Investigator, National Center of Biotechnology, Madrid, Spain
 1993-1996	Postdoctoral Fellow, Cold Spring Harbor Laboratory, New York, USA. supervisor Dr. Carol. W. Greider
 1992-1993	Postoctoral Fellow, Center of Molecular Biology, Madrid, Spain. supervisor Dr. Margarita Salas
 1989-1992       Graduate Fellow, Center of Molecular Biology, Madrid, Spain supervisor Dr. Margarita Salas

Honours and awards 
 2021 - Progressive Women of Retirement Award in its IV edition.
 2019 - Optimist Award Committed to Science awarded by the magazine Anoche Tuve un Sueño
 2018 - In 2018 it was included in the Periodic Table of Scientists to commemorate in 2019 the International Year of the Periodic Table of Chemical Elements, to celebrate the 150th anniversary of Mendeleev's publication.
 2017 - Distinction from the Generalitat Valenciana for Scientific Merit, 14th Balmis Rotary Club Alicante Award,
 2016 - Women to Follow Award 2016, in the category Special Award for Excellence in scientific dissemination.
 2013 - Fellow of the Royal Academy of Pharmacy of Spain
 2012 - Member of the Scientific Board of the AXA Research Fund
 2012 - Member of the Scientific Board of the Vall d’Hebron Institut de Recerca (VHIR) 
 2012 - Member of the Board of Trustees and President of the External Advisory Board of the Spanish National Centre for Research on Ageing (CNIE)
 2012 - Pezcoller Foundation-AACR International Award for Cancer Research Selection Committee
 2012 - Official Nominator for the "2014 Japan Prize" awarded by The Japan Prize Foundation, Japan
 2012 - Spanish Ministry of Foreign Affairs and International Cooperation  "Embajadora Honoraria de la Marca España-2013"
 2012 - Santiago Grisolía Chair 2012 in Biomedicine and Neurosciences, Spain
 2011 - 2011 Award in Innovation and Social Transformation, Fundación IDEAS, España.
 2011 - Fundación Pilates VIIth Edition "Health & Wellbeing" Award, Spain
 2011 - Universidad Autónoma de Madrid Alumni Association Award, Spain
 2011 - VIth Yo Donna International Award in Professional Achievements
 2010 - National Research Award Santiago Ramón y Cajal.
 2010 - Lilly Foundation Preclinical Research Award
 2009 - Prize "Alberto Sols" for Excellence in Research
 2008 - Körber European Science Award
 2007 - Rey Jaime I Prize for Basic Research
 2005 - Carmen and Severo Ochoa Award in Molecular Biology
 2004 - EMBO Gold Medal Heidelberg.
 2004 - The Carcinogenesis Young Investigator Award
 2003 - Josef Steiner Cancer Research Award 2003.
 2003 - "Universalia" Research Award 2003
 2002 - "EMBO Lecture" Award at ELSO Meeting 2002
 2002 - Early Career Award 2002. European Life Sciences Organization (ELSO).
 2002 - "Young Cancer Researcher Award" European Association for Cancer Research (EACR).
 2001 - SEBBM Beckman/Coulter Award 2001 
 2001 - Award of the Spanish Health Science Foundation for excellence in Biomedical Research 
 2000 - Swiss Bridge Award 2000 for Research in Cancer 
 2000 - FEBS Anniversary Prize 
 1999 - II Spanish National Oncology Award (Echevarne)

Publications 
More than 200 articles, see MA Blasco at Google Scholar

References

External links 
 AXA Research Fund
 Vall d’Hebron Institut de Recerca (VHIR) 
 Spanish National Centre for Research on Ageing (CNIE)
 Lifeboat Foundation
 IDEAS 2011 Award in Innovation and Social Transformation
 The 2004 winner of the EMBO Gold Medal is María Blasco
 Josef Steiner Cancer Research Award 2003.
 FEBS Anniversary Prize

1965 births
Living people
Spanish biologists
Spanish women scientists
People from Alicante